Tomáš Klimenta (born 14 April 1984) is a Czech professional ice hockey player who currently plays with HC Bílí Tygři Liberec in the Czech Extraliga.

Klimenta previously played for HC Berounští Medvědi, BK Mladá Boleslav and HC Benátky nad Jizerou.

References

External links 
 

Czech ice hockey forwards
BK Mladá Boleslav players
HC Benátky nad Jizerou players
HC Berounští Medvědi players
HC Bílí Tygři Liberec players
HC Dynamo Pardubice players
HC Oceláři Třinec players
HK Dubnica players
Living people
MsHK Žilina players
1984 births
Sportspeople from Jablonec nad Nisou
Czech expatriate ice hockey players in Slovakia